Falkirk is one of 32 unitary authority council areas of Scotland. It was formed on 1 April 1996 by way of the Local Government etc. (Scotland) Act 1994 from the exact boundaries of Falkirk District, one of three parts of the Central region created in 1975, which was abolished at that time. Prior to the 1975 reorganisation, the majority of the council area was part of the historic county of Stirlingshire, and a small part, namely Bo'ness and Blackness, was part of the former county of West Lothian.

The council area borders with North Lanarkshire, Stirling and West Lothian, and, across the Firth of Forth to the northeast, Clackmannanshire and Fife. The largest town is Falkirk; other settlements, most of which surround Falkirk within  of its centre, include Bo'ness, Bonnybridge, Denny, Grangemouth, Larbert, Polmont, Shieldhill, Camelon and Stenhousemuir.

The council is led by the SNP which gained 12 seats in the 2017 Council Election.  The incumbent leader of is councillor Cecil Meiklejohn; the provost is Robert Bissett and the deputy provost is David Balfour.

History
The town of Falkirk was made a burgh in 1600, and was then governed by a town council (also known as the corporation) until 1975. Scotland's counties, burghs and landward districts were abolished in 1975 under the Local Government (Scotland) Act 1973, and replaced with upper-tier regions and lower-tier districts. A new Falkirk District was created as one of three districts within the Central Region. The new district was significantly larger than the old Falkirk burgh, covering the whole area of eight former districts and part of a ninth, which were all abolished at the same time:

From Stirlingshire:
Central No. 2 District, excluding most of Kilsyth parish
Denny and Dunipace Burgh
Eastern No. 1 District
Eastern No. 2 District
Eastern No. 3 District
Falkirk Burgh
Grangemouth Burgh
From West Lothian:
Bo'ness Burgh
Bo'ness District

The resulting area could also be defined in terms of parishes as:
Airth
Bo'ness and Carriden
Denny
Dunipace
Falkirk
Grangemouth
Kilsyth: Banknock polling district only
Larbert
Muiravonside
Slamannan

Local government was reformed again in 1996 under the Local Government etc. (Scotland) Act 1994, which abolished the regions and districts which had been created in 1975, replacing them with unitary council areas. Central Region was abolished and each of the area's three districts, including Falkirk, became council areas.

Governance

Political control
The first election to Falkirk District Council was held in 1974, initially operating as a shadow authority alongside the outgoing authorities until the new system came into force on 16 May 1975. A shadow authority was again elected in 1995 ahead of the change to council areas which came into force on 1 April 1996. Political control since 1975 has been as follows:

Falkirk District Council

Falkirk Council

Leadership
The leaders of the council since 2001 have been:

Premises
From the district council's creation in 1975, it was based at the Municipal Buildings on West Bridge Street in Falkirk, which had been built for the former Falkirk Town Council and had been formally opened on 21 January 1966. The building was part of a complex which also included a courthouse, a clinic, and an events venue and theatre called Falkirk Town Hall. Prior to 1966 the town council had been based at the old Municipal Buildings at 12–14 Newmarket Street in the town centre, which had been built in 1879.

After deciding the 1966 building was uneconomic to repair and maintain, the council vacated the Municipal Buildings in 2020 pending their demolition. The attached Falkirk Town Hall closed in 2023. Discussions on a possible replacement headquarters for the council are continuing as at 2023, with the council's offices in the meantime being distributed across several buildings throughout the area.

Elections
Since 2007 elections have been held every five years under the single transferable vote system, introduced by the Local Governance (Scotland) Act 2004. Election results since 1995 have been as follows:

Wards

For the purposes of elections to Falkirk Council, the area is divided geographically into a number of wards which then elect either three or four councillors each by the Single Transferable Vote system. The electoral system of local councils in Scotland is governed by the Local Governance (Scotland) Act 2004, an Act of the Scottish Parliament which first introduced proportional representation to councils. These electoral wards are as follows:

 Ward 1 – Bo'ness and Blackness (3 councillors)
 Ward 2 – Grangemouth (3 councillors)
 Ward 3 – Denny and Banknock (4 councillors)
 Ward 4 – Carse, Kinnaird and Tryst (4 councillors)
 Ward 5 – Bonnybridge and Larbert (3 councillors)
 Ward 6 – Falkirk North (4 councillors)
 Ward 7 – Falkirk South (3 councillors)
 Ward 8 – Lower Braes (3 councillors)
 Ward 9 – Upper Braes (3 councillors)

Communities
The area is divided into 23 community council areas, eleven of which have community councils as at 2023, being those with asterisks.

Airth Parish*
Avonbridge and Standburn
Banknock, Haggs and Longcroft*
Blackness*
Bonnybridge
Bo'ness*
Brightons*
Camelon, Bantaskine and Tamfourhill*
Carron and Carronshore
Denny and District*
Falkirk Central
Falkirk South
Grahamston, Middlefield and Westfield
Grangemouth*
Langlees, Bainsford and New Carron
Larbert, Stenhousemuir and Torwood
Lower Braes
Maddiston
Polmont*
Reddingmuirhead and Wallacestone*
Shieldhill and California
Slamannan and Limerigg*
Whitecross

References

External links
Falkirk Council Website

 
Council areas of Scotland
Districts of Scotland
Politics of Falkirk (council area)
1975 establishments in Scotland